Denis Neale is a male former English international table tennis player.

He won a bronze medal at the 1969 World Table Tennis Championships in the mixed doubles with Mary Wright.

He was six times National Singles Champion and also won two English Open titles.

See also
 List of England players at the World Team Table Tennis Championships
 List of World Table Tennis Championships medalists

References

English male table tennis players
1944 births
Living people
World Table Tennis Championships medalists